Glenelm Park is a neighbourhood in the east quadrant of the city of Regina, Saskatchewan. 

The neighbourhood is bounded by Canadian Pacific Railway tracks on the north, Victoria Avenue on the south, Ring Road on the east and Park Street on the west. It is a residential neighbourhood located east of the historic Germantown.

Demographics

Prior to December 1, 1960, Glenelm Park was incorporated as a village, and was amalgamated with the City of Regina on that date.

Services

Glen Elm Library is located on Dewdney Avenue between Oxford and Cavendish Streets next to the Glencairn Shopping Centre. It is a full-service branch that offers a variety of programs, services, and collections suitable for all ages.

See also
List of neighbourhoods in Regina

References

External links
2001 Neighbourhood Profile Regina Neighbourhood Map

Former villages in Saskatchewan
Neighbourhoods in Regina, Saskatchewan